Aesop Dekker (born October 1, 1970) is an American musician. He is best known for being the drummer of the bands Hickey, Ludicra, Agalloch, Worm Ouroboros, VHÖL and Khôrada.

References

1970 births
Living people
American rock musicians
American heavy metal musicians
Musicians from Florida
American people of Romanian descent